The 1979 Gillette Cup was the seventeenth Gillette Cup, an English limited overs county cricket tournament.  It was held between 27 June and 8 September 1979. The tournament was won by Somerset County Cricket Club who defeated Northamptonshire County Cricket Club by 45 runs in the final at Lord's.

Format
The seventeen first-class counties, were joined by five Minor Counties: Berkshire, Buckinghamshire, Devon, Durham and Suffolk.  Teams who won in the first round progressed to the second round. The winners in the second round then progressed to the quarter-final stage.  Winners from the quarter-finals then progressed to the semi-finals from which the winners then went on to the final at Lord's which was held on 8 September 1979.

First round

Second round

Quarter-finals

Semi-finals

Final

References

External links
CricketArchive tournament page 

Friends Provident Trophy seasons
Gillette Cup, 1979